Fred Stolle and Lesley Turner were the defending champions, but lost in the semifinals to Tony Roche and Judy Tegart.

Ken Fletcher and Margaret Smith defeated Roche and Tegart in the final, 12–10, 6–3 to win the mixed doubles tennis title at the 1965 Wimbledon Championships.

Seeds

  Fred Stolle /  Lesley Turner (semifinals)
  Ken Fletcher /  Margaret Smith (champions)
  Dennis Ralston /  Maria Bueno (semifinals)
  Neale Fraser /  Helga Schultze (second round)

Draw

Finals

Top half

Section 1

Section 2

Section 3

Section 4

Bottom half

Section 5

Section 6

Section 7

Section 8

References

External links

X=Mixed Doubles
Wimbledon Championship by year – Mixed doubles